Parascelidae is a family of crustaceans belonging to the order Amphipoda.

Genera:
 Eusceliotes Stebbing, 1888
 Hemiscelus
 Parascelus Claus, 1879
 Schizoscelus Claus, 1879
 Thyropus Dana, 1852

References

Amphipoda